In chemistry, meta is a prefix, used for systematic names in IUPAC nomenclature. It has several meanings.

In organic chemistry, meta indicates the positions of substituents in aromatic cyclic compounds. The substituents have the 1,3-positions, for example in resorcinol.
Meta may also denote the dehydrated form of an acid, salt or organic derivative in a series. For example:
metabisulfite: 2  bisulfite → 1 metabisulfite  + 
metaphosphoric acid: 3 orthophosphoric acid  → 1 trimetaphosphoric acid + 3 .

See also 

Arene substitution patterns

References 

Chemistry prefixes